The Ihrhove–Nieuweschans railway is an international railway line running from Ihrhove near Leer in Germany to Bad Nieuweschans in the Netherlands. The line was opened in 1876. Ihrhove is situated on the north-south Emsland Railway, between Papenburg and Leer. At Bad Nieuweschans, a connection with the Dutch railway network is provided through the Harlingen–Nieuweschans railway, which passes through Groningen. On 3 December 2015, the bridge over the Ems was destroyed by a ship colliding with it. A bus replacement service operated between Bad Nieuweschans and Leer following the accident. The line between Bad Nieuweschans and Weener reopened on 5 July 2016, with a bus replacement service in operation between Weener and Leer.

Stations
There are two stations on the Ihrhove–Nieuweschans railway: Bad Nieuweschans and Weener.

Accidents and incidents

Replacement of the bridge was then expected to take five years.

In July 2018, a plan for a new 160 meter swing bridge was announced, expected to open in 2024.

References

International railway lines
Railway lines in Lower Saxony
Railway lines in the Netherlands
Railway lines opened in 1876